Eternal Music Production Co., Ltd. is a Taiwanese record label and entertainment company founded by Taiwanese talent manager Ke Fu-hung and singer Jolin Tsai in 2009 in Taipei, Taiwan. It manages Tsai's day-to-day business affairs and coordinates the production and enforcement of copyright for her sound recordings and music concerts.

Music productions

Albums 
 Play (2014)
 Play World Tour (2018)
Ugly Beauty (2018)
The Wolf Original Television Series Soundtrack (2020)

Singles 
 "Kaleidoscope" (2014)
 "The Third Person and I" (2014)
 "I Wanna Know" (2016)
 "Play" (Alesso remix version) (2016)
 "Ego-Holic" (2016)
 "Give Love" (2017)
 "We Are One" (2017)
 "On Happiness Road" (2017)
 "Stand Up" (2017)
"The Player" (2018)
"Ugly Beauty" (2018)
"Untitled" (2022)

Show productions 
 Play World Tour (2015–2016)
Ugly Beauty World Tour (2019–2023)

References

External links 

2009 establishments in Taiwan
Companies based in Taipei
Entertainment companies established in 2009
Jolin Tsai
Record labels established in 2009
Taiwanese record labels
Taiwanese talent agencies